Nassarius horridus, common name the horrid nassa, is a species of sea snail, a marine gastropod mollusk in the family Nassariidae, the Nassa mud snails or dog whelks.

Description
The length of the shell varies between 8 mm and 15 mm.

The small shell is ovate, subglobular, and spined. The spire is conical and pointed. It is composed of six or seven whorls. The body whorl is much larger than all the others. The spire presents on its exterior longitudinal folds, upon which are regularly disposed pointed, conical tubercles, which are of the same color as the rest of the shell. The first row of these spines is situated immediately beneath the suture. The last one obliquely intersects the base of the shell. Transverse striae, pretty fine and numerous, are observed between each of the rows of the spines. The white aperture is semilunar. The outer lip is thick and furnished internally with fine striae.  The columella is nearly straight, covered by the inner lip which forms a callosity. The color is uniform, of a white fawn, sometimes pale orange.

Distribution
This marine species occurs off Durban, Rep. South Africa, off East Africa; Madagascar, Réunion, Aldabra; and in the Indo-West Pacific: East India , Western Thailand, Papua New Guinea, Indonesia, the Philippines, Indo-Malaysia, Ryukyu Islands, Solomon Islands, Marshall Islands, New Hebrides, New Caledonia, Loyalty Islands, Fiji, Tonga, Samoan Islands, Caroline Islands; and off Australia (Northern Territory, Queensland, Western Australia).

References

 Dunker, G. 1847. Diagnoses Buccinorum quorundam novorum. Zeitschrift für Malakozoologie 4: 59–64
 Quoy, J.R.C. & Gaimard, J.P. 1833. Voyage de découvertes de l'Astrolabe, exécuté par ordre du Roi, pendant les années 1826–1829. Paris : J. Tastu Zoologie Vol. 2 pp. 321–686.
 Gould, A.A. 1850. Descriptions of the shells brought home by the U.S. Exploring Expedition (cont.). Proceedings of the Boston Society of Natural History 3: 151–156  
 Cernohorsky, W.O. 1984. Systematics of the family Nassariidae (Mollusca: Gastropoda). Bulletin of the Auckland Institute and Museum. Auckland, New Zealand 14: 1–356
 Wilson, B. 1994. Australian Marine Shells. Prosobranch Gastropods. Kallaroo, WA : Odyssey Publishing Vol. 2 370 pp.
 Higo, S., Callomon, P. & Goto, Y. 1999. Catalogue and Bibliography of the Marine Shell-bearing Mollusca of Japan. Japan : Elle Scientific Publications 749 pp.
 Marais J.P. & Kilburn R.N. (2010) Nassariidae. pp. 138–173, in: Marais A.P. & Seccombe A.D. (eds), Identification guide to the seashells of South Africa. Volume 1. Groenkloof: Centre for Molluscan Studies. 376 pp.

External links
 
 

Nassariidae
Gastropods described in 1847